Peu del Funicular is a railway station in the Sarrià-Sant Gervasi district of Barcelona. It is served by lines S1 and S2 of the Metro del Vallès commuter rail system, and is also the lower terminus of the Funicular de Vallvidrera. Both commuter rail and funicular are operated by Ferrocarrils de la Generalitat de Catalunya, who also run the station.

The station has twin tracks on the main line, with twin side platforms. The main part of each side platform is in tunnel, and only long enough to accommodate two cars, although narrow extensions in the open air of the Sarrià side of the station allow passenger to disembark from, but not board, a third car. When four car trains are used, the car at the Vallès end of the train stops beyond the station and the doors do not open. Stairs, lifts and a footbridge connect these two platforms with the street level station entrance above, and with the funicular terminus above that.

The first station on the site opened in 1906, when it was the terminus of the line from Sarrià, providing an interchange with the funicular that allowed passengers to continue their journey to Vallvidrera on the hill above. In 1916, the Collserola tunnel, and the line onward to the Vallès opened. As a result, the station's platforms moved to their current, partly underground location.

See also
List of railway stations in Barcelona

References

External links
 
 Information and photos about the station at Trenscat.com

Stations on the Barcelona–Vallès Line
Railway stations in Spain opened in 1906
Railway stations in Spain opened in 1916
Transport in Sarrià-Sant Gervasi
Railway stations located underground in Spain